The Javanese shrew (Crocidura maxi) is a species of mammal in the family Soricidae. It is native to Indonesia and East Timor. It ranges throughout Java and the Lesser Sunda Islands. It has also been introduced to Ambon Island and the Aru Islands.

References

 Insectivore Specialist Group 1996.  Crocidura maxi.   2006 IUCN Red List of Threatened Species.   Downloaded on 30 July 2007.

Crocidura
Mammals of Indonesia
Mammals of Timor
Mammals described in 1936
Taxonomy articles created by Polbot